Red Shambhala: Magic, Prophesy, and Geopolitics in the Heart of Asia is a 2011 non-fiction work by Andrei Znamenski. The book explores the links between Bolshevik revolutionaries and their attempt to influence Vajrayana Buddhism in Mongolia and Tibet, as well as indigenous shamanic elements in the Russian Far East. In particular, some elements within the Bolsheviks were interested in using the apocalyptic Shambhala prophesies of the Kalachakra Tantra to influence the Buddhists into supporting Marxist-Leninism.

Figures
Alexander Barchenko
Gleb Bokii
Boris Pankratov
Pyotr Kozlov
Nicholas Roerich
Ja Lama
9th Panchen Lama
Agvan Dorzhiev

Events
 Russian Civil War
 Mongolian Revolution of 1921
 Kalmyk Project

See also
 Shambhala-Agartha
 Kalachakra Tantra
 Buddhism in Russia
Shamanism in Siberia
 Pan-Mongolism
 Parapsychology
 Parapolitics
 The Great Game

References

External links
Buddhists, Occultists and Secret Societies in Early Bolshevik Russia: an interview with Andrei Znamenski
Bolshevik “Liberation Theology” : Oirot/Amursana Prophecy Meets Communism
The Bolsheviks Occult War at Espionage History Archive

2011 non-fiction books
Books about the Soviet Union
Books about Mongolia
Books about Tibet
History books about Buddhism
Geopolitics